Wolferlow is a village and civil parish in northern Herefordshire, England, about  north of Bromyard.

In the fourteenth century the manor  of Wolfelow belonged to the Earl of March; about 1310 it was granted to Walter de Thornbury, a retainer of the Earl, who became Lord Chancellor of Ireland. Thornbury died in a shipwreck in 1313 while attempting to secure confirmation of his election as Archbishop of Dublin.

References

Villages in Herefordshire